The Jinbin Expressway is a direct expressway link from central Tianjin to Tanggu and TEDA. It is 33.54 km in length, 28.54 of which exists as an expressway, and 5 km as a city express road.

Route
The Jingjintang Expressway runs through the Tianjin in its entirety.

Basic Route: Tianjin (Dongxing Bridge - Zhangguizhuang Bridge - Tanggu)

Status: The entire expressway is complete.

History
The Jinbin expressway was opened in late February 2001.

The expressway slashes driving time on the equidistant Jintang Highway by 20 minutes.

Road Conditions

Speed Limit
Designed speed limit of 120 km/h.

Tolls
Toll expressway, uses sensor-style IC cards.

Lanes
4 lanes (2 up, 2 down).

Connections

 Middle Ring Road (Tianjin): Dongxing Bridge
 Outer Ring Road (Tianjin): Zhangguizhuang Bridge

Expressways in China
Road transport in Tianjin